Hotel Christiania Teater – is a historic Oslo city hotel and landmark built in 1918, known primarily for the notability of its theater inside the hotel and recently its unique hotel design by Annemone Wille Waage. The 102-unit hotel is located in Stortingsgata 16, next to Spikersuppa and the main pedestrian street Karl Johans gate with the Royal Palace on one side and the parliament on the other side, around the corner of the building is the Oslo City Hall and just in front of the building the National Theatre. The building has been on the National Register of Historic Places since 2015.

Building
The building was raised 1918 in a post modern Nordic Renaissance style, drawn by the architect , in a joint venture with the Danish architect Hack Kampmann, Hack was also known for Marselisborg Castle, and Ny Carlsberg Glyptotek and museum in Copenhagen.

References

External links

www.restaurantteatro.no
nordichotels.com/
christianiateater.com

1918 establishments in Norway
Hotels established in 1918
Hotel buildings completed in 1918
Hotels in Oslo
Hospitality companies of Norway
Nordic Hotels & Resorts